Arnstein Aassve (born June 19, 1968) is a Norwegian professor in demography, current director of the PhD program in Social and Political Science and former dean of the Undergraduate School at Bocconi University. His research lies in the intersection of sociology, demography and economics and is currently focused on studying the effects of globalisation and culture on demographic outcomes and trends. He is currently leading the FutuRes project (Towards a resilient future of Europe) funded by the Horizon Europe program.

Education and personal life 

Aassve started his higher education career in 1988 with a BSc in Economics, Law and Computer Science from Molde University College (Norway). He then moved to the University of Bristol (UK) where he obtained his Diploma in Economics, MSc in Economics and Finance, and in 2000 his PhD in Economics with a thesis on an econometric analysis of family formation.

Aassve is married with two children and is currently living in Milan. He is an avid downhill skier.

Academic career 

After he obtained his PhD from the University of Bristol, Aassve started his academic career at the Max Planck Institute for Demographic Research (Rostock, Germany) as a research scientist. He stayed there two years where he published several papers on transition to adulthood and home leaving. He then moved back to the UK for a tenured position as lecturer in Economics at the University of Leicester and afterwards as a Chief Research Officer at the Institute for Economic and Social Research (ISER, University of Essex). In this period he continued his research in demography and family formation but focused on their interaction with poverty. 

In 2007 he moved to Italy, starting his career at Bocconi University. Initially an assistant professor in Demography, he quickly became an associate professor, deputy director of DONDENA Centre for Research on Social Dynamics and programme director of the bachelor's in international economics, management and finance. In 2014 Aassve became full professor of Demography and dean of the undergraduate school. Currently, he is honorary fellow at University of Wisconsin – Madison, director of the PhD program in Public Policy and administration, associate editor of the European Journal of Population and chair of the panel for the social sciences and humanities starting grant 2018 (SH3, European Research Council).

Research 
Aassve was one of the first researchers to put demographic trends into the perspective of welfare regime classification. His research has focused on how demographic trends can be understood through trends in welfare provision and trust.

By developing this theory and publishing articles providing theoretical and empirical evidence, he carried out the role of principal investigator for several research funds and grants, among which:
 “Poverty dynamics and fertility in developing countries”, 2004
 “GGP”, European Framework Program 7 Infrastructure project, 2008
 “MULTILINKS”, European Framework Program 7, 2008
 “Consequences of Demographic Change” (CODEC), European Research Council (ERC), 2008
 “Institutional Family Demography" (IFAMID), European Research Council (ERC), 2017 Recently his research focused on the impact of the COVID pandemic on fertility trends, mental wellbeing, trust and social cohesion in Europe.

Additional achievements 
Aassve obtained the Dirk van de Kaa award in Social Demography 2014. This Award honours outstanding achievements by an individual scholar in social demography, and the interplay of population dynamics and social change.

He is also the co-founder of the interdisciplinary Alp-Pop Conference. Initiated in 2011 it has attracted world leading social scientists concerned with population issues.

Selected publications 

 Murtin, F., Fleischer, L., Siegerink, V., Aassve, A., Algan, Y., and others. (2018). Trust and its determinants, OECD.
 Aassve, A., Mencarini, L., & Sironi, M. (2015). Institutional change, happiness, and fertility. European Sociological Review, 31(6), 749-765.
 Aassve, A., Fuochi, G., & Mencarini, L. (2014). Desperate housework: Relative resources, time availability, economic dependency, and gender ideology across Europe. Journal of Family Issues, 35(8), 1000-1022.
 Aassve, A., Cottini, E., & Vitali, A. (2013). Youth prospects in a time of economic recession. Demographic Research, 29, 949-962.
 Aassve, A., Arpino, B., & Goisis, A. (2012). Grandparenting and mothers’ labour force participation: A comparative analysis using the generations and gender survey. Demographic Research, 27, 53-84.
 Aassve, A., Burgess, S. M., Dickson, M., & Propper, C. (2006). Modelling poverty by not modelling poverty: an application of a simultaneous hazards approach to the UK.

References

External links 

 Bocconi University's faculty
 IFAMID's Principal Investigator

Alumni of the University of Bristol
Norwegian economists
Academic staff of Bocconi University
Norwegian demographers
Norwegian expatriates in Italy
1968 births
Living people